Fashion Valley (also referred to Fashion Valley Mall) is an upscale, open-air shopping mall in Mission Valley in San Diego, California.  The shopping center has  of leasable floor area, making it the largest mall in San Diego and one of the largest in California.  It is managed by the 50% owner Simon Property Group.

History

Launch (1969)
Fashion Valley, developed by Ernest W. Hahn at a cost of $50 million, opened on October 12, 1969, (September 8 soft launch) on a  site part of which had held the baseball stadium Westgate Park.  Aiming to be the leading shopping center in the San Diego region, it opened with 3 full-line department store anchors:
J.W. Robinson's - architects William Pereira and Associates
 Buffum's - architects Killingsworth, Brady and Associates
The Broadway— designed by Charles Luckman and Associates and stated to have been the biggest Broadway opening of the 20 years up to that time. Broadway subsequently closed its Downtown San Diego store, the former Marston's flagship.

Within a year, the center would add a two-story J. C. Penney (opened Fall 1970), a Joseph Magnin specialty department store and a Woolworth discount store or five and dime (opened March 1970).

Since its opening, the mall has undergone several expansions and changes.

1980s
The first major renovation was in August 1981 added Nordstrom and Neiman Marcus, establishing Fashion Valley as the fashion leader in the valley. The Joseph Magnin chain went out of business in 1984.

1990s
In 1991, Buffum's closed, and their location was reopened in 1992 by upscale specialty San Francisco department store I. Magnin.  However, the upscale company eventually closed all stores in the mid-90s, and the Fashion Valley location was replaced by Saks Fifth Avenue in 1995. Robinson's became a Robinsons-May in 1993, while The Broadway was purchased by Macy's in 1996, rebranding it as a Macy's store with fashion departments only (chain's home and furniture departments are found at Westfield Mission Valley's location, formerly Bullock's).

In October 1997, Gene Kemp led a $110 million renovation project, enlarging the Macy's, Nordstrom and Robinsons-May stores. In 2001, the owner of the property, Lend Lease Prime Property Fund, brought in Simon Property Group as half-owner and manager of the property.

2000s
Due to the merger of May Department Stores and Federated Department Stores in 2006, Robinsons-May closed their store in March of that year, and the location was replaced by San Diego's first Bloomingdale's on November 18, 2006.

2010s
Due to underperformance, Saks Fifth Avenue closed its Fashion Valley location on July 17, 2010. The space was replaced with and still houses a Forever 21.

In 2019, the Simon Property Group announced another renovation inspired by 'San Diego's relaxed lifestyle' that would add public spaces, landscaping, a broader selection of dining, outdoor "lounges" and water features. This would be the largest renovation done to the center since the 90's and is expected to be finished by November 2021. RDC provided architectural design services.

Anchors
Bloomingdale's
JCPenney
Macy's
Neiman Marcus
Nordstrom

Mexican customer base
Fashion Valley is one of many shopping centers in the San Diego area which has customers from both Tijuana (a city of more than 2 million bordering the City of San Diego, 20 miles to the south of Fashion Valley), and visitors from the interior of Mexico (such as Mexico City), as an important part of its customer base. In 1977, 10% of transactions were with Mexican nationals. In 2019 Simon Malls again reiterated the importance of its customers visiting from Mexico.

Legal issues
Fashion Valley Mall was involved in a legal case involving the quasi-public nature of some private property. The printers union wanted to distribute leaflets in the mall encouraging patrons to boycott Robinsons-May, because Robinsons-May was an advertiser in the San Diego newspaper with which the printers union was negotiating.
The court held that this activity was protected and allowed on the property, even though the action was contrary to the business interests of the targeted tenant. The decision is based on article 1 section 2 of the California Constitution.

See also

 Westfield Mission Valley
 Westfield UTC
 Otay Ranch Town Center
 Las Americas Premium Outlets

References 

Shopping malls in San Diego County, California
Buildings and structures in San Diego
Mission Valley, San Diego
Shopping malls established in 1969
1969 establishments in California
Tourist attractions in San Diego